The Washita Basin Project is a project in the U.S. state of Oklahoma.  The project provides a municipal and industrial water supply to seven Oklahoma towns. The project also provides over 3,500 acres of land and 7,300 acres of water surface for recreation and provides over 6,300 acres of land and over 5,500 acres of water surface for wildlife management, including the Washita National Wildlife Refuge.

History 
Investigations by the United States Bureau of Reclamation began in 1945 to create a plan to address the basin's water supply problems and needs with further land and water resources development. Surveys were then conducted in 1946 and 1951 to determine what form of improvement was needed. The project was authorized in 1956 and work began on both the Foss Reservoir and the Fort Cobb Reservoir in 1958. The Fort Cobb Dam was completed in 1959 and the Foss Dam in 1961. Construction on the aqueduct for the Foss Reservoir lasted from 1960 to 1962 and on the Anadarko (Fort Cobb) aqueduct from 1958 to 1961.

Facilities 
 Fort Cobb Reservoir
 Foss Reservoir

References 

 
<div>

United States Bureau of Reclamation
Water in Oklahoma